Maxillaria montezumae, the Montezuma maxillaria, is a species of orchid native to Colombia. It is named after the Montezuma area in the Tatamá National Natural Park in the departments of Chocó and Risaralda.

References

External links 

montezumae
Orchids of South America